Canaan Gents is a Ugandan Acapella Vocal Band  composed of Geofrey Elvin Amanyire, Samuel Lubwama, Wasswa Elijah Kissiti and  Kato Elisha Kissiti.

History
Canaan Gents began 30 November 2011 with Samuel Lubwama, Victor Tusiimire, Kevin Kiggundu, Aijuka Rodney and Nsereko Derrick while at Uganda Christian University, Mukono.

The Canaan Gents have songs like Nkwagala and Azaaliddwa

Themes
The music of Canaan Gents addresses themes relating to gospel songs.

Awards
Canaan Gents has been previously nominated in various awards such as in HiPipo Music Awards.

References

External links

Ugandan musical groups
Musical groups established in 2015
Musical quintets